Franz Rudolf Frisching (1733–1807) was a Bernese patrician, officer, politician and industrialist.

Life and career 
Franz Rudolf Frisching was the son of Vinzenz Frisching (1689–1764) who was Master of Schlosswil. In 1748 Franz Rudolf Frisching became a member of the Swiss Guard of the Netherlands where he achieved the rank of a colonel. In 1764 Frisching became a member of the  Grand Council of Bern. In 1770 he became bailiff in the Vallemaggia, in 1780 bailiff in St. Johannsen and in 1793 office holder in Wimmis. He was lieutenant colonel of the Bernese Jäger Corps.

Franz Rudolf Frisching was the founder of the Frisching Faience Manufactory in Bern.

Between 1750 and 1777 the Frisching family was in the possession of the large Lorraine Gut, a former country estate which is now part of the city of Bern. Franz Rudolf Frisching’s ancestor, Samuel Frisching (II), built the Frisching-Haus, now known as the Béatrice-von-Wattenwyl-Haus on the Junkerngasse in Bern.

Notes

References
 Walter A. Staehelin: Keramische Forschungen aus bernischen Archiven in: Keramikfreunde der Schweiz, Mitteilungsblatt Nr. 81(1970), p. 3-34
 Robert L. Wyss: Kachelöfen. in: Bern und die bildenden Künste, in: Illustrierte Berner Enzyklopädie, Bd. IV. Kunst und Kultur im Kanton Bern, Bern 1987, p. 107-109
 Historisches Museum Bern: Geschirr für Stadt und Land – Berner Töpferei seit dem 16. Jahrhundert. Bern 2007, 2. 22-25.  (BHM)
 André Holenstein: Berns goldene Zeit. Das 18. Jahrhundert neu entdeckt, Bern 2008, p. 112
 Roland Petitmermet: Berner Uniformen 1700–1850. Historischer Verein des Kantons Bern, Bern 1977,

External links 

1733 births
1807 deaths
Swiss politicians
People from Bern
Frisching family
Swiss military officers
Swiss nobility
Swiss reeves